Henry Hector Bolitho (28 May 1897 – 12 September 1974) was a New Zealand writer, novelist and biographer, who had 59 books published. Widely travelled, he spent most of his career in England.

Biography
Hector Bolitho was born and educated in Auckland, New Zealand, the son of Henry and Ethelred Frances Bolitho. He travelled in the South Sea Islands in 1919 and then through New Zealand with the Prince of Wales in 1920.

Bolitho lived in Sydney from 1921 to 1923, where he became editor of the Shakespearean Quarterly and literary editor and drama critic of the Evening News in Sydney.

He also travelled in Africa, Canada, America, and Germany in 1923-4, finally settling in Britain where he was to remain for the rest of his life.

On his arrival in Britain he worked as a freelance journalist; in 1927 he also provided a glowing introduction to (former journalist of the Evening News and future crime writer) Max Murray's first book, a sea voyage called The World's Back Doors (Jonathan Cape, 1927), the sixty-first book in Jonathan Cape's Traveller's Library series.

At the start of World War II he joined the Royal Air Force Volunteer Reserve (RAFVR) as an intelligence officer with the rank of squadron leader, editing the Royal Air Force Weekly Bulletin, which in 1941 became the Royal Air Force Journal. In 1942 he was appointed editor of the Coastal Command Intelligence Review.

Bolitho undertook several lecture tours of America (in 1938–39, 1947, 1948, and 1949) and he also revisited Australia in later years.

In his forties, Bolitho shared his life and his home with John Simpson. Hector described John as his ‘secretary’, which was then a common euphemism for gay partner. Simpson later died and his long-term partner was Derek Peel, an army officer. They met in 1949 and were together until Bolitho's death in 1974.

Bolitho is referenced in fictional form as "Hector Bolithiero" in the Denton Welch short story "Brave and Cruel".

The name Bolitho is of Cornish origin.

Bibliography

References

External links
 Dictionary of National Biography
 Hector Bolitho at Dunedin Public Library website
 World War I New Zealand Army military personnel file

1897 births
1974 deaths
British biographers
British gay writers
New Zealand people of Cornish descent
New Zealand emigrants to the United Kingdom
New Zealand LGBT novelists
Gay novelists
British male novelists
British monarchists
20th-century British novelists
20th-century British historians
20th-century British male writers
Royal Air Force Volunteer Reserve personnel of World War II
Royal Air Force squadron leaders
Male biographers
20th-century LGBT people